Queensland Nickel is a company owned by businessman and former politician Clive Palmer. Queensland Nickel owns and operates the Palmer Nickel and Cobalt Refinery at Yabulu in North Queensland, Australia. The refinery was established in July 1971 Palmer acquired the refinery in 2009 from BHP Billiton. On 19 January 2016 the company entered into voluntary administration. In April, 2016 the company's creditors voted for liquidation.

Operations 
The refinery carries out two operations: ore processing and refining. By design, the front-end of the refinery is where the ore is processed whereas the back-end is where it is refined and prepared for sale to the international market. The ore used in these two operations is received via rail from a facility at the Port of Townsville.

When operating at full capacity, the Palmer Nickel and Cobalt Refinery is responsible for over $1 billion of output in the North Queensland economy and is the largest employer helping to generate over 3,000 direct and indirect jobs in Queensland.

History 
The company was established in July 1971. The Yabulu Nickel Refinery was completed in 1974, after geologists commenced exploration of the Greenvale deposit, an area originally mapped by officers of the Bureau of Mineral Resources in 1957. The Greenvale railway line was built to transport the ore from Greenvale to the refinery in Yabulu.

In 1986, the first test shipments of Nickel ore from Indonesia and New Caledonia were processed at the refinery with regular shipments starting in 1988 and 1989. It was in 1989 that the refinery's internationally patented ammoniac AL solvent extraction technology was introduced to the refining process to significantly improve the separation of nickel and cobalt.

Queensland Premier, Anna Bligh, asked Clive Palmer to purchase the refinery and save jobs in North Queensland. Palmer acquired the refinery in 2009 from BHP Billiton. As part of the purchase, Palmer had to personally guarantee over $3 billion to ensure workers' jobs were safe. The impact on the local economy was immense as the refinery's operations were responsible for 1970 full-time equivalent jobs in North Queensland, $150 million in income and salaries in addition to $1.1 billion in output for the local economy.

When the operation was first acquired by Palmer in 2009, the cost of production was over $8 per pound. During the course of the next five years, the manager and director Clive Mensink (Palmer's nephew) was responsible for the reduction in the cost of production to $4.40 per pound. The reduction in production costs ensured that the QN Group of companies was still able to continue operations and employ people, despite the falling price of nickel on the world market.

Environmental issues 
A freedom of information request by the Northern Queensland Conservation Council in 2014 showed that Queensland Nickel discharged nitrate-laden water into the Great Barrier Reef in 2009 and 2011—releasing  of toxic waste water on the latter occasion. In June 2012, Queensland Nickel stated it intended to release waste water, continuously for three months, "at least 100 times the allowed maximum level as well as heavy metals and other contaminants". A Great Barrier Reef Marine Park Authority (GBRMPA) briefing stated the company had "threatened a compensation claim of $6.4bn should the GBRMPA intend to exert authority over the company's operations". In response to the publicisation of the dumping incidents, the GBRMPA stated:We have strongly encouraged the company to investigate options that do not entail releasing the material to the environment and to develop a management plan to eliminate this potential hazard; however, GBRMPA does not have legislative control over how the Yabulu tailings dam is managed.

Financial troubles
However the government rejected the request, citing the refusal of the company to share full details with the government and its large donations to Palmer's Palmer United Party. Despite its financial troubles, Queensland Nickel donated more than $20 million to the Palmer United Party in two years including a donation of $288,516 days before the workers were terminated. On 15 January 2016 the company Queensland Nickel Pty Ltd terminated 237 workers. The company blamed poor nickel prices, which were at a twelve-year low and the refusal of the Queensland Government to support industry and jobs in North Queensland.

In  March 2016 it was proposed by Palmer to transfer the employment of hundreds of employees, including their entitlements, to a new company Queensland Nickel Sales, a joint venture between two of Clive Palmer's companies, QNI Resources Pty Ltd and QNI Metals Pty Ltd, with Mensink as director. The plan was that the new company would continue to operate the refinery and would pay the outstanding expenses incurred during the administration, but required the administrator to agree transfer the cash held in the Queensland Nickel Pty Ltd bank account. In a sworn affidavit, Kelly-Anne Trenfield explained why the administrators would not agree to this transfer of cash. After the report by the administrators on Clive Palmer and Queensland Nickel on 11 April 2016, politicians and media from around the country criticised Palmer. In early April 2016 the administrators, FTI Consulting, found that the company had "incurred debts of $771 million after going insolvent in November". On 22 April 2016 the company's creditors voted to liquidate it.

In April 2018 Palmer claimed the attacks were politically motivated and launched a counter claim and is suing the liquidators for $1.8 billion in damages.

Future 
On 29 June 2018, Palmer held a press conference in Townsville to address the claims against him and announced his intention to re-open the refinery and create hundreds of jobs.  Due to high cobalt prices in 2018, there is also an estimated $6 billion worth of cobalt in the tailings dams onsite at the refinery operations in Yabulu. At the same time Palmer began his return to Australian politics.

In popular culture 
The subject of the Slim Dusty song "Three Rivers Hotel" is the building of the railway line from the Greenvale Mine to the Yabulu Refinery in the early 1970s.

See also

Mining in Australia

References

External links
 Company Website

Companies based in Queensland
Australian companies established in 1971
Mining companies of Australia
Mining in Queensland